Uvaria rufa is a species of vines or shrubs commonly known as susung-kalabaw ('Carabao teats') or Torres Strait scrambler, of the plant family Annonaceae. It grows naturally in Philippines (where it is called /triəl svaː/ ទ្រៀលស្វា), Laos, Thailand, New Guinea, more widely in Malesia and in Cape York Peninsula Australia.

Description
Uvaria rufa are monoecious evergreen trees that grow to a height of 4 to 6 meters. Their deep green leaves are arranged alternately and have a heart-shaped base. The surface is velvety and coarse to the touch. The flowers are small and have deep red waxy petals. The fruits, which appear from May to August, are aggregates of round or oblong berries colored deep orange or a rich red. Each contains numerous seeds encased in a translucent pulp.

Uses
The fruits of Uvaria rufa are edible, having a sharp sweet-sour taste. They are known colloquially as Suso ng kalabaw or susung-kalabaw ('Carabao teats') because of its physical appearance.

The wood is also used as a Rattan substitute in making furniture and handicrafts.

References

rufa
Flora of Indo-China
Flora of Malesia
Flora of Papuasia
Flora of Queensland